Wynyard is an urban locality adjacent to Wynyard railway station in the Sydney central business district of New South Wales, Australia. Wynyard is part of the local government area of the City of Sydney. The postcode is 2000. Wynyard Park is a prominent landmark in this area.

History
Wynyard was named in honour of Major-General Edward Buckley Wynyard, a former British Army officer who, in September 1847, was put in command of the troops in New South Wales, Van Diemen's Land and New Zealand.

Transport
Wynyard railway station is located underground and is a major Sydney Trains railway station, serviced by six lines. It is also a major bus terminal, serving as the CBD terminus for many routes from the Northern Beaches and North Shore.

See also

 Suburbs of Sydney

References

Sydney localities